Walter R. McComas (January 23, 1879 – April 19, 1922) was an American politician and lawyer from Maryland. He served as a member of the Maryland House of Delegates, representing Harford County, from 1906 to 1909.

Early life
Walter R. McComas was born on January 23, 1879, at My Lady's Manor in Baltimore County, Maryland. He moved to Harford County in 1885. He was educated at public schools and graduated from Bel Air High School in 1898. He entered the law office of Thomas H. Robinson and was admitted to the bar in 1904.

Career
In 1902, McComas was appointed by Governor John Walter Smith as magistrate. From 1900 to 1910, McComas was a member of Company D, First Regiment of the Maryland Army National Guard. He rose to the rank of captain.

McComas was a Democrat. He served as a member of the House of Delegates, representing Harford County, from 1906 to 1909. McComas was elected as state's attorney in 1915. He was re-elected in 1919.

Personal life
McComas married Mabel M. They had one son, John Alden.

McComas died on April 19, 1922, at Church Home and Infirmary in Baltimore. He was buried at Bethel Cemetery.

References

1879 births
1922 deaths
People from Baltimore County, Maryland
Democratic Party members of the Maryland House of Delegates
Maryland National Guard personnel
State's attorneys in Maryland